Xylecata hemixantha is a moth of the  family Erebidae. It is found in Angola, Cameroon, the Democratic Republic of Congo, Gabon and Rwanda.

References

Nyctemerina
Moths described in 1904